Kulbakul-e Bozorg (also Romanized as Kūlbākūl-e Bozorg; also known as Kūlbākūn, Kūlbākūn-e Pā‘īn, and Kūlbākūn Pā‘īn) is a village in Rostam-e Yek Rural District, in the Central District of Rostam County, Fars Province, Iran. At the 2006 census, its population was 68, in 12 families.

References 

Populated places in Rostam County